This is a list of electoral results for the electoral district of Dalhousie in Victorian state elections.

Members for Dalhousie

      # = by-election

Election results

Elections in the 1920s

Elections in the 1910s

 Preferences were not distributed.

References

Victoria (Australia) state electoral results by district